In shogi, Side Pawn Capture, Bishop*45 variation or Side Pawn B*4e (横歩取り☖４五角 yokofudori yon-go kaku) is a Rapid Attack Side Pawn Capture variation in which White drops their bishop on the 45 square after the bishops are traded attacking Black's rook.

Rapid Attack development

The ☖Bishop*45 Side Pawn variation is one of the Rapid Attack (急戦 kyūsen) subvariations of Side Pawn Capture that starts with bishop trade initiated by White (that is, 8...Bx88+ 9.Sx88). It is named after the bishop drop position – the 45 square – that White makes three moves after the bishop trade. This Side Pawn Capture substrategy was popular in the early 1980s. Much of the theory was advanced from the games (in 1978-1979) and analysis of Koji Tanigawa. After much research, this variation is thought to be unsound  at the professional level since perfect play by Black leads to an unfavorable position for White. However, at the amateur level, the complex variation may be difficult for both sides to navigate giving winning chances for either player.

The position is reached by the following the Side Pawn Capture opening with 1.P-76 P-34 2.P-26 P-84 3.P-25 P-85 4.G-78 G-34 5.P-24 Px24 6.Rx24 P-86 7.Px86 Rx86 8.Rx34 and, subsequently, veering into the Rapid Attack lines with 8...Bx88+ 9.Sx88 to reach the position shown in the adjacent digram. (See: Side Pawn Capture for discussion of these preceding moves, especially §White's bishop trade variations.)

9...P*28. The variation starts with this move.

Main line: ☗10.Sx28

10.Sx28.

10...B*45.

☗11.R-24

11.R-24. Considered the best reply for Black.

☖11...P*23

☗12.B*77

☖14...N-33

☖14...S*87

☖14...R*25

☗12.P*87

☗12.R-26

☖11...Bx*67+

☗11.B*77

11.B*77. The old joseki move but now considered not as strong as 11.R-24.

☗11.R-35

☗11.P*87

☗10.B*77

☖10...Rx88+

☖10...Rx76

Without ☖9...P*28

9...B*45. Dropping the bishop to 45 without playing 9...P*28 10.Sx28 first is considered a blunder for White.

See also

 Side Pawn Capture
 Double Side Pawn Capture
 Side Pawn Capture Bishop-33

References

External links
 HIDETCHI's YouTube videos:
 Side Pawn Capture: B*4e Strategy #1
 Side Pawn Capture: B*4e Strategy #2 (Bx3f variation)
 Side Pawn Capture: B*4e Strategy #3 (S*6f variation)
 Side Pawn Capture: B*4e Strategy #4 (S*6f variation)
 Professional player Akira Nishio's blog Shogi Openings:
 Side Pawn Capture, △B*45 strategy (1)
 Side Pawn Capture, △B*45 strategy (2)
 Yet Another Shogi Site: Side Pawn Capture: △B45 Variation

Shogi openings
Side Pawn Capture openings